Giovanna Crivelari Anselmo (born 23 February 1993) is a Brazilian professional footballer who plays as a forward for Levante.

Club career
In August 2021, Crivelari transferred to Levante and signed a two-year contract with the Spanish club.

References

1993 births
Living people
Women's association football forwards
Brazilian women's footballers
Sportspeople from Londrina
Sociedade Esportiva Kindermann players
Sport Club Corinthians Paulista (women) players
Levante UD Femenino players
Primera División (women) players
Campeonato Brasileiro de Futebol Feminino Série A1 players
Brazilian expatriate women's footballers
Expatriate women's footballers in Spain
Brazilian expatriate sportspeople in Spain